Danka Kovinić was the defending champion, but lost in the first round to Tessah Andrianjafitrimo.

Jasmine Paolini won the title, defeating Tatjana Maria in the final, 6–4, 2–6, 6–1.

Seeds

Draw

Finals

Top half

Bottom half

References
Main Draw

Open Féminin de Marseille - Singles